Istiqlol (formerly: Oqteppa) is a village and jamoat in north-western Tajikistan. It is located in Spitamen District in Sughd Region. The jamoat has a total population of 18,015 (2015).

References

Populated places in Sughd Region
Jamoats of Tajikistan